The third season of The Voice Kids, premiered on Rede Globo on January 7, 2018 in the 2:00 / 1:00 p.m. (BRST / AMT) daytime slot.

Teams
 Key

Blind auditions
Key

Episode 1 (Jan. 7)

Episode 2 (Jan. 14)

Episode 3 (Jan. 21)

Episode 4 (Jan. 28)

Episode 5 (Feb. 4)

Episode 6 (Feb. 11)

The Battles
Key

Live shows

Elimination chart

Artist's info

	

Result details

Week 1

Showdown 1

Week 2

Showdown 2

Week 3

Quarterfinals

Week 4

Semifinals

  With Mariah Yohana and Talita Cipriano tied with 45 points each, coach Carlinhos Brown had the casting vote and controversially choose to eliminate fan favorite Mariah Yohana. However, when producers reverted to the earlier public vote, it was noted that, without rounding, Mariah would have remained in the competition with 45.05 against Talita's 44.82. As result, 3 hours after the show's live broadcast, Rede Globo announced that both artists were sent to the final.

Week 5

Finals

References

External links
Official website on Gshow.com

Kids 3
2018 Brazilian television seasons